Possibilities is a 2005 jazz album by  Herbie Hancock.

Possibilities may also refer to:
Possibilities (King Never album), a 2010 album by American rock band King Never
The Possibilities, Athens, Georgia rock band
"Possibilities", 1982 TV episode of Knots Landing (season 3, episode 12)
"Possibilities", 2004 TV episode of Mutant X (season 3, episode 11)
"Possibilities", a song by Weezer from their 2002 album Maladroit
The Possibilities (Preacher), an episode of the television series Preacher

See also
Possibility (disambiguation)